Pljevlja Municipality is located in northwestern region of Montenegro. It covers an area of 1,346 and had a population of 30,786 at the 2011 census.

Geography and location
The municipality borders Žabljak Municipality, Bijelo Polje Municipality and Mojkovac Municipality in Montenegro, as well as the republics of Serbia and with Bosnia and Herzegovina.

Demographics
Town of Pljevlja is the administrative center of Pljevlja municipality, which has a population of 35,806. The town of Pljevlja itself has 19,136 citizens, and is the only town in the municipality with a population of over 1,000. The municipality has a majority of Serbs. According to the 2011 census, the population consisted of: Serbs (60.11%), Montenegrins (21.52%), Muslims (8.14%) and Bosniaks (5.21%).

Settlements

Aliži
Beljkovići
Bjeloševina
Bobovo
Boljanići
Borišići
Borova
Borovica
Boščinovići
Brda, Pljevlja
Bujaci
Bušnje
Čardak, Pljevlja
Čavanj
Čerjenci
Cerovci
Čestin
Crljenice
Crni Vrh, Pljevlja
Crno Brdo
Crnobori
Donja Brvenica
Dragaši, Pljevlja
Dubac
Dubočica
Dubrava, Pljevlja
Đuli
Đurđevića Tara
Durutovići
Dužice
Geuši
Glibaći
Glisnica
Gornja Brvenica
Gornje Selo
Gotovuša
Gradac, Pljevlja
Gradina, Pljevlja
Grevo
Horevina
Hoćevina
Jabuka, Pljevlja
Jagodni Do
Jahovići
Jasen
Jugovo
Kakmuži
Kalušići
Katun, Pljevlja
Klakorina
Kolijevka
Komine
Kordovina
Kosanica
Kotlajići
Kotline
Kotorac
Kovačevići
Kovači, Pljevlja
Kozica, Pljevlja
Košare
Krupice
Kruševo, Pljevlja
Krćevina
Kržava
Kukavica, Pljevlja
Lađana
Leovo Brdo
Lever Tara
Lijeska, Pljevlja
Ljutići
Ljuće
Lugovi, Pljevlja
Male Krće
Maoče
Mataruge
Meljak
Metaljka
Mijakovići
Milakovići
Milunići
Mironići
Moraice
Moćevići
Mrzovići
Mrčevo
Mrčići
Nange
Obarde
Odžak
Ograđenica
Orlja, Pljevlja
Otilovići
Pauče
Petine
Pižure
Plakala
Planjsko
Pliješ
Pliješevina
Poblaće
Podborova
Popov Do
Potkovač
Potkrajci, Pljevlja
Potoci, Pljevlja
Potpeće, Pljevlja
Potrlica
Pračica
Prehari
Premćani
Prisoji
Prošće
Pušanjski Do
Rabitlje
Rađevići
Romac
Rudnica, Pljevlja
Rujevica, Pljevlja
Selac
Selišta, Pljevlja
Sirčići
Slatina, Pljevlja
Šljivansko, Pljevlja
Šljuke
Srećanje
Stančani
Strahov Do
Šula
Šumani
Tatarovina
Trnovice
Tvrdakovići
Uremovići
Varine
Vaškovo
Velike Krće
Vidre, Pljevlja
Vijenac
Vilići
Višnjica
Vodno
Vojtina
Vrba, Pljevlja
Vrbica, Pljevlja
Vrulja
Zabrđe, Pljevlja
Zaselje, Pljevlja
Zbljevo
Zekavice
Zenica, Pljevlja
Židovići
Zorlovići

Local parliament

Settlements
Beljkovići
Bjeloševina
Bobovo
Boljanići
Borišići
Anonymous user
2A

Gallery

References

Municipalities of Montenegro